The history of the England national football team begins with the first representative international match in 1870 and the first officially-recognised match two years later. England competes in the FIFA World Cup, UEFA European Championship, and UEFA Nations League.

The Three Lions first entered the World Cup in 1950 and have since qualified for 16 of the 19 finals tournaments to 2022. Their best performance was during 1966 on home soil as champions. England are therefore one of only eight nations to have won a FIFA World Cup. They have reached the semi-finals on two other occasions: 1990 and 2018. England failed to qualify for the finals in 1974, 1978, and 1994.

England also compete in the UEFA European Championship. During UEFA Euro 2020, they reached the final of the competition for the first time. England have also reached the semi-final of the competition in 1968 and 1996 with the latter held on home soil. England's most capped player is Peter Shilton with 125 caps and its top goalscorers are Wayne Rooney and Harry Kane with 53 goals each.

Early years

1870–1900

England's first international representative matches were arranged by the influential sports administrator Charles Alcock, under the auspices of the Football Association. The first five friendly matches, which all took place at The Oval, London, were played against Scotland between 1870 and 1872. However, these are not considered full internationals by FIFA because the Scotland teams were composed entirely of London-based Scottish players.

England's first FIFA-recognised international football match was a 0–0 draw against Scotland at Hamilton Crescent in Partick, Glasgow, on 30 November 1872. Scotland was represented by players from Glasgow's Queen's Park club. The first England team in this match was:
Robert Barker (Hertfordshire Rangers), goal; Harwood Greenhalgh (Notts Club), three-quarter back; R. C. Welch (Harrow Chequers), half back; F. Chappell (Oxford University), fly-kick; capt. Cuthbert Ottaway (Oxford University), middle; Charles Chenery (Crystal Palace), middle; Charles Clegg (Sheffield), middle; Arnold Kirke-Smith (Oxford University), middle; J. Brockbank (Oxford University) right side; W. J. Maynard (1st Surrey Rifles) left side; J. F. Morris (Barnes Club) left side.
The following year, England beat Scotland 4–2 at the Kennington Oval, but in 1878, a resurgent Scotland thrashed England 7–2 at Hampden Park in Glasgow. This stood as a record for either side in the fixture for 77 years, until England beat Scotland 7–2 at Wembley during the 1955 Home Championship.

1900–1939
Over the next 40 years, most of England's fixtures were against Scotland, Wales and Ireland in the Home Championship. This was partly due to the dominance of the United Kingdom in international football, and the problems of arranging continental internationals before the advent of air travel. England faced their first continental opposition in a tour of Central Europe in 1908, beating Austria, Hungary and Bohemia. England's first defeat outside the British Isles was a 4–3 loss to Spain in Madrid in May 1929.

The England national amateur football team was formed in 1901, when amateur players could no longer easily find places in the main national team. Great Britain, rather than England and other home nations, is represented in the Olympic Games. But the Great Britain teams that won gold medals in the 1908 and 1912 Olympic football tournaments were constituted by England national amateur team players. A similar team was knocked out early in 1920 Olympic football. No Great Britain team entered in 1924 after dispute concerning the regulation of professionalism.

Although the FA had joined FIFA in 1906, the relationship with the British associations was fraught. In 1928, the British nations withdrew from FIFA, in a dispute over payments to amateur players. This meant that England did not enter the first three World Cups. However, they did defeat the 1934 World Cup winners Italy 3–2, in a match dubbed the "Battle of Highbury", in November 1934.

On 1 December 1937, Stanley Matthews scored a hat-trick in England's 5–4 victory over Czechoslovakia. The England team also included Vic Woodley, Wilf Copping, Stan Cullis, Len Goulden, Willie Hall, John Morton and Bert Sproston.

In May 1938, England toured Europe. The first match was against Germany in Berlin. Adolf Hitler wanted the game to be a showcase for Nazi propaganda. While the England players were getting changed, a Football Association official went into their dressing room, and told them that they had to make the Nazi salute during the playing of the German national anthem. Stanley Matthews later recalled: 

The FA official left, but returned saying he had a direct order from British Ambassador Sir Neville Henderson that the players must make the salute, because the political situation between Britain and Germany was now so sensitive it needed "only a spark to set Europe alight". Reluctantly the England team raised their right arms, except for Stan Cullis who refused, and was subsequently dropped from the squad.

The game was watched by 110,000 people as well as senior Nazis, including Hermann Göring and Joseph Goebbels. England won the game 6–3. The game included a goal scored by Goulden that Matthews described as "the greatest goal I ever saw in football". According to Matthews: 

On 1 September 1939, Germany invaded Poland. Three days later, Neville Chamberlain declared war on Germany. The government immediately imposed a ban on the assembly of crowds resulting in the end of all league football matches apart from some unofficial wartime internationals played between 11 November 1939 and 5 May 1945, for which the largest crowd was 133,000 on 24 April 1944 and again on 14 April 1945 in matches at Hampden Park.

Post-war era

1950 and 1954 World Cups
Between 27 May 1945 and 19 May 1946, England played seven unofficial victory internationals, an unofficial international match against Scotland on 24 August 1946 (2–2), and unofficial internationals against Switzerland and Switzerland 'B'. The FA rejoined FIFA in 1946, the same year they appointed the first dedicated team manager, Walter Winterbottom (although the team was picked by a committee). Winterbottom's reign began strongly with a series of lopsided victories, providing a false sense of security that the post-war England team had retained its early international preeminence. In 1948, England gained two notable victories, 4–0 against the reigning world champions Italy in Turin, and 10–0 against Portugal in Lisbon, after which the players involved famously became known as the "lions of Lisbon".

England's fortunes then took a sharp decline, losing for the first time against non-UK opposition at home when they were defeated 2–0 by the Republic of Ireland in 1949 at Goodison Park, Liverpool. England's World Cup debut came in 1950; however, they suffered an infamous 1–0 defeat by the United States, and failed to get beyond the first group stage after also losing against Spain in their final game.

England's increasing tactical inferiority was highlighted on 25 November 1953, when Hungary came to Wembley. Fielding legendary players such as Ferenc Puskás, József Bozsik, Sándor Kocsis, Zoltán Czibor and Nándor Hidegkuti, Hungary outclassed England 6–3 – this was England's first home loss to opposition from outside of the British Isles. In the return match in Budapest, Hungary won 7–1, which still stands as the worst defeat in England's history. Ivor Broadis scored England's goal. After the game, the bewildered England centre-half Syd Owen said, "It was like playing people from outer space."

In the 1954 World Cup, two goals by Broadis saw him become the first England player to score two goals in a game at the World Cup finals. In the same match, Nat Lofthouse also scored twice in a 4–4 draw against Belgium. England reached the quarter-finals for the first time, but were eliminated 4–2 by Uruguay. Only twice have England progressed beyond the World Cup quarter-finals away from home.

Munich disaster and the 1958 World Cup

On 15 May 1957, Stanley Matthews made his last appearance for England, in a 4–1 defeat by Denmark in Copenhagen. He was 42 years and 104 days old and remains the oldest player to represent his country.

Hopes of success at the 1958 World Cup finals were hit by the Munich air disaster in February that year, which claimed the lives of eight Manchester United players. Three of the players who died were established England internationals. They were full-back Roger Byrne, who had never missed an England game since making his debut for the country in 1954, centre-forward Tommy Taylor, who had scored 16 goals in just 19 appearances for his country, and wing-half Duncan Edwards, who was then widely regarded as the finest player in English football at that time. Also killed was David Pegg, who had just made his debut for England and was tipped as the successor in the national team to Tom Finney, who retired from international action later in 1958. Winger Johnny Berry, who had been capped four times for England, survived the crash but was injured to such an extent that he never played football again.
 
Forward Bobby Charlton, who was injured in the crash, recovered sufficiently to make his England debut in April that year and begin one of the great England international careers, which eventually yielded 106 caps, 49 goals and a World Cup winner's medal. He was named in the squad which travelled to Sweden for the World Cup finals, but did not kick a ball as England exited in the group stages after a play-off defeat against the Soviet Union, after the two had finished level in second spot in their group. England's inside forward Johnny Haynes remarked after elimination in 1958, "Everyone in England thinks we have a God given right to win the World Cup." Joe Mears as chief selector became the scapegoat.

England's early elimination highlighted how far the national team had fallen behind the rest of the world during the 1950s. However, by the end of the decade, emerging talents such as the prolific goalscorer Jimmy Greaves suggested that sufficiently talented players were available, provided the tactical side of the game could bring the best out of them.

1960s

World Champions
By the 1960s, English tactics and training had started to improve, and England turned in a respectable performance in the 1962 World Cup in Chile, losing in the quarter-finals to the eventual winners, Brazil. By now, more young players were making their mark, including the elegant young defender Bobby Moore. Indeed, the squad taken by England to Chile was the youngest, on average, ever taken to a major tournament, with no player over the age of 29, the oldest being the 28-year-old Maurice Norman. After Winterbottom retired in 1962, England's former captain Alf Ramsey was appointed and crucially won the right to choose the squad and team himself, taking that role away from the selection committee. Ramsey boldly predicted that England would win the next World Cup, which England were hosting.

Ramsey's prediction came true, and the 1966 World Cup on home soil was England's finest moment. Ramsey's England team were nicknamed the "Wingless Wonders", a phrase coined by the press after Ramsey devised a new 4-3-3 system that relied on hard-running midfield players rather than natural wingers. An unremarkable group phase saw them win two and draw one of their games, with a 30-yard strike by Bobby Charlton at Wembley against Mexico proving a highlight. An injury to the centre-forward Jimmy Greaves in the final group match against France prompted Ramsey into a rethink for the quarter-final against Argentina, and the inexperienced replacement Geoff Hurst responded by scoring the only goal of the game. Charlton then hit both goals in a 2–1 semi-final win over Portugal to take England into the final, where they met West Germany.

By now, Greaves was fit again, but Ramsey kept faith with Hurst, despite calls from the media for the main goalscorer to return. England won the final 4–2 after extra time, with three goals from Hurst and one from Martin Peters. Hurst's second goal became the most controversial in England football history, with West Germany's players protesting that the ball did not fully cross the goal-line after bouncing down from the crossbar. In 1995, researchers from Oxford University announced the results of computer video analysis of the television footage, which gave new angles of view: they concluded that the shot had not crossed the line. Moore became the first and, to date, only England captain to lift the World Cup.

The game prompted a memorable piece of commentary from the BBC's Kenneth Wolstenholme when describing the run and shot from Hurst which led to his third goal at the end of extra time: "Some of the crowd are on the pitch, they think it's all over!...It is now!" Hurst has stated that, with England already leading 3–2, he was merely trying to put the ball into the stand to kill the last few seconds, but his shot found the German net.

At the 1968 European Championships, England reached the semi-finals before losing to Yugoslavia  1–0, with a goal in the 87th minute. Alan Mullery became the first player to be sent off while playing for England.

In Mexico, for the 1970 World Cup, many observers considered that England had a stronger squad than in 1966. The world-class nucleus of Bobby Charlton, Moore and Gordon Banks was still intact; Hurst, Peters and Alan Ball had further enhanced their reputations, and Mullery, Terry Cooper, Colin Bell and Allan Clarke had been added to the squad.

England's preparations in Colombia were disrupted when Bobby Moore was arrested in the Bogotá Bracelet incident, before he was given a conditional release. Despite the intense tropical heat and humidity, England progressed with some ease to the quarter-finals, despite a 1–0 defeat by the favourites Brazil in the group stage, which was notable for a stunning save from by Banks from Pelé and one of Moore's finest performances in an England shirt.

In the quarter-finals, at the Estadio Nou Camp in León, England again faced West Germany. However, Banks was ruled out with food-poisoning, and his late replacement, was the talented but internationally inexperienced Peter Bonetti,  had not played a competitive match for over a month. England coasted into a 2–0 lead just after half-time with goals from Mullery and Peters, but the Germans fought back to 2–2 through Franz Beckenbauer and Uwe Seeler. Hurst had a goal disallowed, and with eleven minutes remaining in extra time, Gerd Müller scored the winning goal for Germany. Some blame was attached to Bonetti, as well as Ramsey for his decision to replace Bobby Charlton in the second half, but ultimately the culpability for defeat was shared by the whole team. Charlton broke Billy Wright's record for England caps in this game but told Ramsey on the flight home from Mexico that he no longer wished to be considered. Ramsay said, "We must now look ahead to the next World Cup in Munich where our chances of winning I would say are very good indeed."

1970s

In Mexico, for the 1970 World Cup, Sir Alf Ramsey thought England had a stronger squad than in 1966. The world-class nucleus of Bobby Charlton, Moore and Gordon Banks was still intact; Hurst, Peters and Alan Ball had further enhanced their reputations, and Mullery, Terry Cooper, Colin Bell and Allan Clarke had been added to the squad.

England's preparations in Colombia were disrupted when Bobby Moore was arrested in the Bogotá Bracelet incident, before he was given a conditional release. Despite the intense tropical heat and humidity, England progressed with some ease to the quarter-finals, despite a 1–0 defeat by the favourites Brazil in the group stage, which was notable for a stunning save from by Banks from Pelé and one of Moore's finest performances in an England shirt.

In the quarter-finals, at the Estadio Nou Camp in León, England again faced West Germany. However, Banks was ruled out with food-poisoning, and his late replacement, was the talented but internationally inexperienced Peter Bonetti, had not played a competitive match for over a month. England coasted into a 2–0 lead just after half-time with goals from Mullery and Peters, but the Germans fought back to 2–2 through Franz Beckenbauer and Uwe Seeler. Hurst had a goal disallowed,[13] and with eleven minutes remaining in extra time, Gerd Müller scored the winning goal for Germany. Some blame was attached to Bonetti, as well as Ramsey for his decision to replace Bobby Charlton in the second half, but ultimately the culpability for defeat was shared by the whole team.[citation needed] Charlton broke Billy Wright's record for England caps in this game but told Ramsey on the flight home from Mexico that he no longer wished to be considered.[citation needed] Ramsay said, "We must now look ahead to the next World Cup in Munich where our chances of winning I would say are very good indeed."[9]

West German and Polish defeats 1972–1974
England failed to reach the final stages of the 1972 European Championships after again losing to West Germany. The two-legged quarter-final resulted in a 3–1 win for the Germans at Wembley and a goalless draw in Berlin. Geoff Hurst made his final England appearance in the first of these games.

Attention then turned to qualification for the 1974 World Cup in West Germany. England had not needed to qualify since 1962, due to the automatic qualification given to them as hosts in 1966 and holders in 1970. After a win and a draw against Wales, England faced Poland, the reigning Olympic champions. The Poles had lost their first match in Cardiff, but England went a goal down from a free-kick after a defensive error by Bobby Moore and the goalkeeper, Peter Shilton. This was compounded two minutes into the second half when Moore allowed Włodzimierz Lubański to dispossess him and make it 2–0. With less than a quarter of an hour to go, Alan Ball became the second player to be sent off while playing for England, which ruled him out of the return match.

England required a victory at Wembley against the Poles to qualify. England created chance after chance but failed to score, largely due to the performance of the Polish goalkeeper, Jan Tomaszewski. Twelve minutes into the second half, Norman Hunter, in the team for Moore, lost the ball to Grzegorz Lato, who squared it for Jan Domarski to shoot under Shilton's body. Although Allan Clarke equalised from a penalty six minutes later and England continued to create chances, the score remained 1–1 and England were eliminated in the qualifiers for the first time in World Cup campaign. Poland went on to finish third in the World Cup the following summer. After this failure, Alf Ramsey was sacked in the spring of 1974, after eleven years at the helm.

Revie years, 1974–1976
After a brief period where Joe Mercer was caretaker manager of the side, the FA appointed Don Revie as Ramsey's permanent successor. England failed to qualify from the group stages of the 1976 European Championships, despite an opening 3–0 win at home over the eventual champions, Czechoslovakia, and a 5–0 win over Cyprus in which Malcolm Macdonald scored all five goals, a post-war record.

A 2–1 defeat in the return in Czechoslovakia and a 0–0 draw at home against Portugal cost England, as they fell a point short of qualification. Revie's methods were criticised – insisting on increasing players' appearance fees when no player had expressed dissatisfaction, calling up oversized squads, dropping or ignoring in-form players, the use of dossiers on the opposition and his attempts to cultivate a "club" atmosphere with the players – and his position was continually undermined by the chairman of the English FA, Harold Thompson, who Ted Croker commented seemed bent on "humiliating" Revie.

Revie selected a squad to take part in a mini-tournament in South America in the summer of 1977, but initially did not accompany the players, saying he was going to scout the opposition England were still due to face in the qualifiers for the 1978 World Cup in Argentina. Instead, he was putting the final seal on a lucrative deal to take charge of the national side of the United Arab Emirates. After his resignation, he was banned from working in English football for a decade, and although he overturned the ban on appeal, his reputation was ruined and he never worked in English football again.

Brian Clough applied for the vacant manager's post, but the FA rejected him and instead gave the role to Ron Greenwood, who had been brought out of retirement to act as caretaker manager after Revie's exit. Greenwood was unable to rescue England's World Cup campaign, the damage already having been done in a 2–0 defeat by Italy in the Stadio Olimpico, Rome in November 1976. Although England won the return against Italy 2–0 and finished level on points with the Italians, they missed out on qualification on goal difference.

1980s

1982 World Cup
Greenwood took England to their first major tournament in a decade when they qualified for the expanded European Championship finals in Italy in 1980. During the qualification campaign, England also played a friendly against Czechoslovakia in which Viv Anderson became the first black player to win an England cap. England were unspectacular at the finals, and did not progress beyond their group, which was topped by Belgium. The team were attracting an ever-growing hooligan element in their support, especially at matches abroad, and Italian police were forced to deploy tear gas in the match against Belgium.

Bryan Robson, Kenny Sansom, Terry Butcher and Glenn Hoddle were already fully fledged internationals as England turned their attention to qualifying for the 1982 World Cup in Spain. England struggled to find consistency in a campaign that saw them lose away to Norway, Switzerland and Romania, and Greenwood was set to resign after one disappointing result before being persuaded to stay on by his players during the flight home. Eventually England benefitted from other results and qualified with a 1–0 win over Hungary at Wembley in the final game.

At the finals, England won all three of their group games, and Robson scored just 27 seconds into the opening match against France. England were eliminated when they finished second in a tough second-round pool that included Spain and West Germany, despite remaining unbeaten in five matches. Greenwood announced his immediate retirement. This was also another tournament marred by violence, a problem which would continue through the rest of the decade when England went overseas.

Robson revival, 1982–1990
Although at the time he was widely derided by the press, Bobby Robson is now looked upon as one of England's more successful managers. He started badly on a public relations front by not telling captain Kevin Keegan that he would not be calling him into his first squad. Keegan heard the news via the media, aired his disgust and retired from the international game.

On the pitch, Robson's England failed to make the final stages of the 1984 European Championships, their hopes of qualification effectively ended in the autumn of 1983 when they lost 1–0 to Denmark at Wembley. Robson resisted calls to quit and the Football Association kept faith in him. At the time, the England team was in a period of transition, with the experienced Mick Mills, Phil Neal, Paul Mariner, Trevor Brooking and Trevor Francis coming to the end of their international careers. However, an impressive set of younger players, including striker Gary Lineker, winger Trevor Steven and midfielder Chris Waddle, comfortably sealed qualification for the 1986 World Cup in Mexico. A month before the tournament started, the team went to train in high altitude conditions in Colorado Springs, followed by a spell in Los Angeles, where they beat the tournament hosts 3–0 in a friendly at the Memorial Coliseum.

In the intense 35 °C heat and humidity of Monterrey, England began the World Cup badly, losing to Portugal, and then drawing with Morocco in a game which saw Ray Wilkins become the first England player to be sent off at a World Cup finals. They also lost their captain Bryan Robson to a dislocated shoulder, which ended his participation in the tournament. Under pressure to qualify, England rescued their campaign with a win over Poland, thanks to a first-half hat-trick from Lineker.

In the second round, England defeated Paraguay 3–0 in the high altitude of Mexico City's Azteca Stadium, with Lineker scoring twice more, but were to fall short in controversial circumstances against the eventual winners Argentina in the quarter finals, after two memorable goals from Diego Maradona – the infamous "Hand of God" goal, where Maradona punched the ball past Peter Shilton into the net, and then a 50-yard dribble past five England players. Lineker pulled a goal back, but England were unable to find an equaliser and went out 2–1. Lineker was the first England player to win the Golden Boot as the tournament's top scorer, with six goals.

England suffered a setback two years later at the 1988 European Championships in West Germany. They qualified comfortably for the tournament, but then lost all three of their group games at the finals. These defeats included a 1–0 defeat in Stuttgart by the Republic of Ireland, playing in the finals for the first time and managed by Jack Charlton, a member of England's 1966 World Cup team. The tournament also marked the final England appearances of Glenn Hoddle and Kenny Sansom after lengthy careers in the England side.

England's performance sparked public and media criticism of Robson, who offered his resignation, but it was rejected and he stayed in charge as England looked to qualify for the 1990 World Cup in Italy. Qualification was sealed without conceding a single goal in the qualifying stages. The tournament was to be Robson's last tournament in charge, as he had decided that he would not extend his contract, and would instead be returning to club football with PSV Eindhoven. It turned out to be England's best World Cup since 1966; after a slow start in the group stage, where they played all their group stage matches in Cagliari on the island of Sardinia at the British government's request, England managed narrow wins after extra-time over Belgium in Bologna and Cameroon in Naples. They were beaten in Turin on penalties by West Germany in the semi-finals after a 1–1 draw, with Stuart Pearce and Chris Waddle failing from the spot.	

England lost the third place play-off 2–1 to Italy in Bari, and so finished fourth. However, several factors in their World Cup run initiated the rehabilitation of football into British society in the 1990s following the Heysel disaster of 1985: the team's good performance, the relative lack of violence, winning the Fair Play Award, and the emergence of Paul Gascoigne, who famously cried after being booked against West Germany, which would have ruled him out of the final had England won.

Another star who emerged was David Platt, a midfielder who went as back-up to Bryan Robson, and came back with three goals and an international reputation. Shilton retired from international football after the World Cup with 125 caps, a national record.

1990s

Graham Taylor: "Best we forget"

Robson's successor, Graham Taylor, failed to build on the team that fared well in 1990, instead discarding older players like Robson and Waddle. While England qualified for the 1992 European Championships in Sweden, they crashed out in the group stage with no wins and only managed a single goal.

Taylor was widely criticised for taking off Lineker in what turned out to be the striker's final England appearance, when England needed a goal and Lineker himself needed to score just one more goal to equal Bobby Charlton's record of 49 for the national team. Taylor was vilified by the press, leading The Sun to begin their infamous 'turnip' campaign. England also hit another low under Taylor's reign when they lost 2–0 to the United States in Boston during a summer tournament in 1993.

England failed to qualify for the 1994 World Cup in the United States after suffering away defeats to Norway in Oslo and the Netherlands in Rotterdam. In the latter game, the Dutch defender Ronald Koeman escaped being sent off after fouling Platt to prevent Platt scoring a goal that would have put England in the lead. Taylor's irate reaction was broadcast to millions as part of the documentary An Impossible Job. Koeman scored shortly afterwards, and Dennis Bergkamp added another as England lost 2–0. In their last qualifying match, England infamously went 1–0 down to San Marino when the minnows scored the fastest World Cup goal after just eight seconds. Although England recovered to win 7–1, the Netherlands also won their final qualifying game to join Norway in qualification and eliminate England.

Taylor resigned the following week. His reign is regarded as one of the bleakest in England's history: in the FA's official history of the England team, the chapter on Taylor's tenure is entitled "Best we forget". A huge list of candidates were touted to replace him, including Steve Coppell, Dave Bassett, Gerry Francis and John Lyall. On 28 January 1994, however, Terry Venables, who had left Tottenham Hotspur in acrimonious circumstances the previous year, was appointed.

Venables: Euro 1996: Football comes home 

Venables oversaw a much improved performance at the UEFA Euro 1996. As the hosts, England qualified automatically, leaving Venables only friendly matches in which to test out potential new players after the World Cup qualifying disaster. In a tournament that marked the 30th anniversary of the 1966 World Cup victory, Venables deployed emerging younger stars such as Steve McManaman, Darren Anderton and Gary Neville alongside established players from previous campaigns, including Gascoigne, Platt, Stuart Pearce and Tony Adams.

England played all their matches at Wembley, and qualified from the first round as group winners. They recorded famous victories over Scotland – 2–0 featuring a crucial David Seaman penalty save and a brilliant Gascoigne goal – and against the Netherlands by 4–1, before winning a penalty shoot-out for the first time in the quarter-finals against Spain. However, England then lost a semi-final on penalties to Germany again after drawing 1–1, with Gareth Southgate missing the decisive penalty in sudden-death when his penalty was saved by Andreas Köpke. Alan Shearer, who had taken over from Lineker as England's core centre-forward, was the tournament's top scorer with five goals.

Due to tension between himself and the FA over the extension of his contract after the tournament, Venables announced in January 1996 that he would step down after the European Championships The Times & The Sunday Times, although it became widely and inaccurately reported that Venables was told by the FA he would not be employed further. This was because of ongoing worries about his business interests.

Hoddle: 1996–99

On 2 May 1996, Glenn Hoddle was named as the new England manager, eight years after his final international appearance, and one year after his last game at club level. Hoddle selected Shearer as his captain, replacing Adams.

Hoddle oversaw England's qualification for the 1998 World Cup in France with a 0–0 draw against Italy at the Stadio Olimpico in Rome. In the summer of 1997, his side were successful in the Tournoi de France, a friendly tournament held before the World Cup, against Brazil and Italy and the competition hosts.

After this promising build-up, however, Hoddle came under fire for omitting fans' favourites Paul Gascoigne and Matt Le Tissier from the squad for the finals, bringing their international careers to an end. England were eventually knocked out of the World Cup on penalties, this time in the last 16 to Argentina in a classic match played in the intense heat of Saint-Étienne. England had led in the first half after a wonder goal from the 18-year-old striker Michael Owen, who had first been capped four months earlier, but were forced to hold in for a 2–2 draw after Beckham was sent off for an altercation with Diego Simeone.

Hoddle revealed only after his team had been knocked out "my innermost thought, which was that England would win the World Cup". Beckham was scapegoated for the defeat, and recalled later that he took so much abuse that "I've got a little book in which I've written down the names of those people who upset me the most. I don't want to name them because I want it to be a surprise when I get them back."

Hoddle's approach attracted criticism over his religious convictions and insistence on employing a faith healer as part of the set-up. Things became worse when his side's results deteriorated after the World Cup, as England suffered a poor start to the Euro 2000 qualifying tournament, and there was reported discontent between Hoddle and several senior players, most notably Shearer. Hoddle was dismissed on 2 February 1999, two days after an interview with The Sunday Times in which he spoke about his belief in reincarnation and claimed that disabled people were paying for sins in a previous life.

Keegan: 1999–2000: "A little bit short."

Under considerable media and public pressure, the FA appointed England's former captain Kevin Keegan as Hoddle's successor. Keegan's team struggled to qualify for the 2000 European Championships; despite a promising win over Poland in the new manager's first match in charge, the Three Lions would struggle during qualification. England entered the play-offs thanks to results elsewhere with Sweden defeating Poland. They secured qualification for the tournament by winning a play-off against Scotland 2–1 on aggregate, but lost the second leg at Wembley. Shearer had announced before the tournament of his intention to retire from international football after the finals. At the finals in Belgium and the Netherlands, a lacklustre England failed to get beyond the group stage. Firstly, they lost to Portugal before defeating Germany 1–0 thanks to a goal by Shearer. The Three Lions were then eliminated by Romania thanks to a penalty with two minutes to go. 

On 7 October 2000, shortly after losing the opening World Cup qualifier to Germany in the last game at Wembley before its redevelopment, Keegan resigned, citing that he was "a little bit short for what is required of this job". The FA's chief executive of the time, Adam Crozier, reluctantly accepted Keegan's resignation in the Wembley tunnel's lavatory, and before leaving the stadium, he telephoned the agent of Sven-Göran Eriksson to talk about the vacancy.  While a deal was set up, Howard Wilkinson was hastily appointed as the stand-in manager for a qualifier with Finland, which England could only draw 0–0. A month later, it was confirmed that Eriksson would be Keegan's permanent successor, but would not take up the job until June 2001 because of his commitment to Lazio.

The former England under-21 manager Peter Taylor was appointed as the caretaker manager for a friendly against Italy, and it was widely expected that he would act as temporary manager until Eriksson formally took charge, despite his own commitment to Leicester City. The matter was rendered moot when Eriksson resigned from Lazio at the start of 2001, allowing him to take over before England's next fixture. However, Taylor did make one consequential decision during his caretaker spell, by giving the position of team captain (which had remained vacant since Shearer's retirement) to Beckham.

2000s

Eriksson, 2001–06: The golden generation

As a Swedish national, Sven-Göran Eriksson became the first foreign coach to be appointed as England's manager, a decision that attracted controversy. However, he immediately turned around the team's qualifying campaign with a 5–1 victory over Germany in Munich, where England came from behind with goals from Emile Heskey, Steven Gerrard and a Michael Owen hat-trick. England ensured qualification for the 2002 FIFA World Cup after a tense final game against Greece, with David Beckham scoring from a free-kick in the last seconds to make the score 2–2 and put England top of their group on goal difference.

In the finals in South Korea and Japan, England beat Argentina 1–0 in the group stage, David Beckham scoring the only goal with a penalty, and reached the quarter-finals, where they met Brazil. England went in front when Owen took advantage of a Brazilian defensive mistake, but an equaliser from Rivaldo and a free-kick by Ronaldinho saw Brazil turn the game round to win 2–1. England could not create any more good chances, despite Ronaldinho later being sent off, and were eliminated by the eventual winners.

For the 2004 European Championships, England came top of their qualification group, with the teenage striker Wayne Rooney installed as a new star in their attack. His emergence was tempered by the loss of defender Rio Ferdinand, who was given an eight-month ban in December 2003 after missing a drugs test, ruling him out of the finals. In England's opening match against France, Frank Lampard scored a first-half goal and despite a missed penalty from Beckham, they still led until the final minutes, when Zinedine Zidane scored two quick goals to win the game for France 2–1. England progressed with Rooney scoring twice in games against both Switzerland and Croatia. In the quarter-finals, Owen scored early against the hosts Portugal, but England's challenge was affected by the loss of Rooney to a broken bone in his foot. Sol Campbell scored a goal that was disallowed and England eventually lost in a penalty shoot-out after a 2–2 draw, with Beckham and Darius Vassell missing their penalties.

2005 saw Eriksson receive heavy criticism from fans for his defensive strategies, alleged lack of passion, lack of communication with the players from the bench and a perceived inability to change tactics when necessary in a game. A 4–1 loss to Denmark in a friendly, was followed by a humiliating 1–0 defeat by Northern Ireland in a World Cup qualifier, David Healy scoring the goal in the 73rd minute. An unconvincing 1–0 victory over Austria followed, in which Beckham became the first England player to be sent off twice in internationals. However, despite further criticism, the result allowed England to qualify for the 2006 World Cup finals with one match to spare, and they travelled to Germany as group winners, following an improved performance and 2–1 victory against Poland in their last qualifier.

In January 2006, following revelations made in the News of the World, the FA decided to come to an agreement with Eriksson over his future, and shortly afterwards it was announced that Eriksson was to stand down after the World Cup finals. Several possible successors were linked with the job; after a series of interviews that was criticised for its length, the Portugal national team manager Luiz Felipe Scolari was allegedly offered the job. In April, however, Scolari declined, in the belief that accepting the offer before a World Cup would conflict with his managerial duties for Portugal. On 4 May 2006, it was announced that Steve McClaren would succeed Eriksson after the World Cup.

England's 2006 World Cup campaign began with a 1–0 against Paraguay in the Waldstadion in Frankfurt, after an early own-goal by Carlos Gamarra from Beckham's free-kick. Late goals from Peter Crouch and Steven Gerrard then secured England's place in the last 16 with a 2–0 victory over Trinidad and Tobago in the Frankenstadion in Nuremberg. Returning from injury after again breaking a bone in his foot, Rooney started England's final group match against Sweden in Cologne, but his strike partner Owen was stretchered off with a cruciate ligament injury in the first minute. A wonder strike from Joe Cole gave England the half-time lead, but Sweden equalised through Marcus Allbäck before Gerrard gave England the lead again in the 85th minute. England, however, were denied a win when Henrik Larsson levelled again in the 90th minute.

In the second round, England beat Ecuador in the last 16 on 25 June in Stuttgart, courtesy of a free-kick from Beckham, who became the first England player to score in three World Cup tournaments. In the quarter-final against Portugal, Beckham was substituted early in the second half with an ankle injury, and then Rooney was sent off for pushing Cristiano Ronaldo and stamping on Ricardo Carvalho's groin, though Rooney later denied it was intentional. A 0–0 draw led to a penalty shoot-out that England lost 3–1, with Lampard, Gerrard and Jamie Carragher all having their attempts saved by the Portuguese goalkeeper Ricardo. The morning after, a tearful Beckham announced that he was stepping down as captain, although he stressed that he was keen to continue playing for England.

McClaren, 2006–07: Qualifying heartache
England's new manager Steve McClaren took over after the 2006 World Cup. He appointed Terry Venables as coach and John Terry as captain, and chose not to recall Beckham to the squad for almost a year. 

England started their 2008 European Championships qualifying campaign well, however, they then drew 0–0 at home with Macedonia and then suffered a 2–0 defeat away to Croatia where a miskick by goalkeeper Paul Robinson allowed a backpass by Gary Neville to roll into the net for the second goal. The pressure on McClaren increased as England drew 0–0 away to Israel after another lacklustre performance.

England played their first match at the new Wembley Stadium against Brazil on 1 June 2007, with Terry scoring in a 1–1 draw for which Beckham was recalled. After further wins over Israel, Russia and Estonia again, all by the score of 3–0, another victory against Russia would have guaranteed qualification, but despite England taking a first half lead through Rooney, Russia came back to win 2–1.

Russia's subsequent defeat to Israel gave England another opportunity - they now required a draw against Croatia, who had already qualified. With Owen, Rooney and Terry missing from the starting line-up, McClaren recalled players that were inexperienced and out of form, such as Micah Richards, Wayne Bridge, Joleon Lescott. Scott Carson was handed his competitive debut in goal, and his mistake gave Croatia a 1–0 lead that they doubled soon after. England improved in the second half, with Lampard converting a penalty and Crouch equalising, but Mladen Petrić's late winning goal for Croatia meant that England missed their first major tournament since the 1994 World Cup.

The sight of McClaren standing on the touchline in the rain during this match became an enduring image of his tenure, and he was labelled "The Wally with the Brolly" by the media. McClaren refused to resign, but the next day, he and Venables were sacked by the FA.

Capello is appointed

On 14 December 2007, Fabio Capello, the former manager of Milan, Real Madrid, Roma and Juventus, was named as the new manager of England. He omitted Beckham for his first match, a 2–1 win in a friendly against Switzerland. England won all of their first eight matches in their 2010 World Cup qualifying group, to qualify with two games to spare for the first time. Their impressive results included two resounding victories over Croatia: 4–1 in Zagreb, when Theo Walcott scored a hat-trick, and 5–1 at Wembley which guaranteed qualification for the 2010 FIFA World Cup.

2010s

Capello: Another World Cup failure

England headed to the 2010 FIFA World Cup in South Africa as favourites to progress through Group C, which included the United States, Algeria and Slovenia. The opening match against the United States started well with Gerrard scoring after just four minutes, but Clint Dempsey equalised with a speculative shot that was mishandled by Rob Green; the game ended 1–1. England's second match against Algeria ended in a goalless draw, leading to the English press questioning Capello's tactics, as well as the team's spirit and ability to handle the pressure.

In the final match of the group stage, England rallied with a 1–0 victory against Slovenia thanks to a goal from Jermain Defoe. However, the United States's last-minute winner against Algeria, meant that England finished as runners-up in the group, leaving them to face the Group D winners Germany in the second round. In the round of 16, Germany took an early 2–0 lead thanks to goals by Miroslav Klose and Lukas Podolski. A goal for Matthew Upson halved the deficit for England. 53 seconds later, Frank Lampard hit a strike that crossed the line. However, the linesmen ruled that it hadn't. After the match, FIFA President Sepp Blatter apologised for the incident. As England searched for an equaliser, Germany scored an additional two goals on the counter attack to seal a 4–1 win.

Despite the World Cup failure, Fabio Capello remained as the England manager despite speculation on his future following England's largest World Cup finals defeat. Capello decided to drop several established internationals for the first friendly of the new season with Capello looking to give some young players a chance for the upcoming matches. Only ten of the 23 players who were included in the 2010 World Cup squad were included for the squad against Hungary, which was won 2–1. England were drawn in Group G of the UEFA Euro 2012 qualifiers alongside Bulgaria, Switzerland, Wales and Montenegro. England won their first match against Bulgaria, 4–0, and four days later they defeated Switzerland 3–1 away. After a 0–0 home draw against Montenegro in October, the year ended with a home friendly against France who took a deserved 2–1 victory, after which England's fans booed the players off the pitch.

At the start of 2011, Jack Wilshere, James Milner and Walcott impressed in a promising 2–1 win over Denmark. In their next European Championship qualifier, England put in a dominant display in a 2–0 victory against Wales at the Millennium Stadium, taking them to the top of the group. After a subdued performance against Switzerland at home in June resulted in a 2–2 draw, England did not return to action until September, having had a friendly against Netherlands called off because of the 2011 England riots. Two more wins, 3–0 in Bulgaria and 1–0 at home to Wales, took them to the brink of qualification, which they sealed with a 2–2 draw in Montenegro. The qualification was marred by the sending off of Rooney, leaving him suspended him for the first game of the finals. This ban was later increased to three and then dropped to two following a subsequent appeal.

Hodgson, 2012–16: More tournament humiliation

In February 2012, the sports manufacturers Umbro revealed a new home kit, designed purely from red and white, with a modified version of the FA's crest also in red tones.

John Terry was stripped of the captaincy for the second time after he was charged for racism offences relating to an incident in a Premier League match with the Queens Park Rangers player Anton Ferdinand. Capello told Italian media that he did not agree with the FA's decision to strip Terry of the captaincy. This resulted in rumours that Capello had breached his contract by failing to back decisions made by the executive board. On 8 February, the FA confirmed that Capello had resigned from the manager's job with immediate effect. On the same day, the Tottenham Hotspur manager Harry Redknapp was cleared of charges for tax evasion, and he was immediately linked with the vacant role.

Stuart Pearce took charge for the rescheduled friendly against the Netherlands, which England lost 3–2, with Scott Parker taking the temporary role as captain. On 1 May 2012, the FA announced that Roy Hodgson would take over as manager of the team. Steven Gerrard was promoted back to the captaincy when the provisional squad for the European Championships was announced. England's first two games under Hodgson were 1–0 wins in friendly matches against Norway away and Belgium at home ahead of Euro 2012. Hodgson's first competitive match was the European Championship match against France in Kharkiv, a 1–1 draw. A dramatic 3–2 win over Sweden, also in Kharkiv, followed by a tense 1–0 victory over the co-hosts Ukraine, saw England top their group and face Italy in the quarter-finals. After a 0–0 draw after extra time, in which England were outplayed, with goalkeeper Joe Hart making numerous saves, England once again lost on penalties.

The year 2013 marked 150 years of the FA, and so a series a special friendly games were scheduled to play throughout the year. These were at home and away against Brazil (a 2–1 win and 2–2 draw), home to the Republic of Ireland (a 1–1 draw), and home to Scotland (a 3–2 win, which saw Rickie Lambert score on his England debut). The Republic of Ireland marked the introduction of another new home kit, with red being replaced by navy blue as the secondary colour. This was the first England kits produced by Nike, ending a long-term association with Umbro. Following a 4–1 win at home to Montenegro in October, Hodgson's side secured qualification by beating Poland 2–0 at home. In November, however, England were given a reality check by Chile and Germany, with respective 2–0 and 1–0 defeats at Wembley. In May 2014, having not been included in the FIFA World Cup squad, Ashley Cole decided to retire from international football having made 107 caps for England. 

England failed to qualify from the group stage of the World Cup in Brazil, suffering defeats to Italy and Uruguay, and drawing 0–0 against Costa Rica. Costa Rica's earlier victory over Italy had eliminated England before the final match. After a World Cup described by some in the media as a debacle, Steven Gerrard and Frank Lampard retired from international football with Wayne Rooney being installed as the new captain after the World Cup. Gerrard retired with 114 caps whilst Lampard retired with 106.

England's first match following the tournament, a 1–0 friendly win over Norway, was the lowest attended England match at the new Wembley. In September 2015, England beat San Marino 6–0 in Serravalle to become the first team to qualify for Euro 2016. Against Switzerland, Rooney broke Bobby Charlton's England goalscoring record with his 50th goal for the national side. Ultimately, England ended their qualifying group with a 100% winning record, becoming only the sixth team in European Championship qualifying history to achieve this.

England were drawn in Group B for UEFA Euro 2016 to face Russia, Wales and Slovakia. Their first match, in Marseille against Russia, finished in a 1–1 draw, as they failed to make their domination in the match pay; Eric Dier had put England in front from a free-kick before they conceded a stoppage time equaliser. In their second match in Lens, against Wales, England fell behind just before half-time when Joe Hart was unable to prevent Gareth Bale scoring from a free-kick. Hodgson responded by bringing on forwards Jamie Vardy and Daniel Sturridge at the start of the second half and the game turned in England's favour as both scored, with Sturridge netting the winner in stoppage time. Hodgson rested six players for the final group match against Slovakia in Saint-Étienne, but it ended in an goalless draw. Wales's 3–0 win over Russia meant England finished as runners-up in Group B and faced Iceland in Nice in the round of 16. 

Rooney scored a penalty inside four minutes, but Ragnar Sigurðsson immediately equalised, and in the 18th minute, Kolbeinn Sigþórsson scored with the help of poor goalkeeping by Hart. Iceland defended resolutely as England struggled to recover, holding on for a famous 2–1 victory. England's players were booed off the pitch, and Hodgson announced his resignation straight after the match, with his assistants Ray Lewington and Gary Neville also leaving their positions.

Allardyce, 2016: Gone in 67 days

A little under a month after the European Championship defeat, the FA appointed Sunderland's manager Sam Allardyce as the new manager of the national side. Allardyce's first match for England was a 2018 World Cup qualifying match in Slovakia. England laboured to a 1–0 win in Trnava, with Adam Lallana scoring in stoppage time.

Shortly before the next round of qualifying matches, The Daily Telegraph broke a story of Allardyce appearing to meet a group of Asian businessmen, who were later revealed to be undercover journalists working for the newspaper. The meeting seemed to show Allardyce explaining how to "get around" breaking football transfer policies and apparently mocking Hodgson, the England players and the Duke of Cambridge. Allardyce apologised for his misconduct, but the FA sacked him on those grounds. His tenure of 67 days is the shortest for a permanent manager in England's history.

Southgate, 2016–: Revival and new young talent

The same day, 27 September 2016, Gareth Southgate left his role as the manager of the England under-21 team and was put in temporary charge of the national team. On 30 November, he was appointed as permanent England manager on a four-year contract. Under Southgate, England finished first in their World Cup qualifying group with eight wins and two draws, scoring 18 goals and conceding just three.

At the World Cup, England were drawn in a group with Belgium, Tunisia and Panama. They began by beating Tunisia 2–1, with two goals from their captain Harry Kane, including a stoppage-time winner. They then hammered Panama 6–1, England's largest win at a World Cup or European Championships, with two goals from John Stones, a hat-trick from Kane and one from Jesse Lingard. With qualification already guaranteed, England lost 1–0 to Belgium and finished second in the group.

England played Colombia in the second round. They led 1–0 through a penalty from Kane before conceding a stoppage-time equaliser, and after extra-time won 4–3 on penalties, with Dier scoring the winning kick. It was England's first penalty shoot-out win at the World Cup. England beat Sweden 2–0 in the quarter-finals, with goals from Harry Maguire and Dele Alli, to reach the World Cup semi-finals for the first time since 1990. England played Croatia in the semi-finals on 11 July. They lost 2–1 despite taking the lead through an early free-kick from Kieran Trippier and dominating the first half. A goal from Ivan Perišić in the 68th minute sent the match into extra-time, and Mario Mandžukić scored the winning goal to take Croatia to their first final. England played Belgium again in the third place play-off, and lost 2–0 to finish fourth. Harry Kane won the golden boot for the tournament with six goals.

Following on from the 2018 FIFA World Cup fourth-place finish, England's best run in the competition since the 1990 World Cup, they took part in the inaugural season of the UEFA Nations League where they were allocated in League A, the top league, and drawn in Group 4 with Spain and Croatia. England, however, were beaten 2–1 by Spain at Wembley, resulting in England's first competitive home defeat since 2007. England followed this up with a 0–0 draw at Croatia in the competition one month later. However, England then pulled off a 3–2 win at Spain as a brace by Raheem Sterling and a goal by Marcus Rashford put them 3–0 up before the break before two consolation goals. On 15 November, England played a friendly match against the United States before which Wayne Rooney reversed his international football retirement to play one final match for England, against the team where he was playing his domestic football, in order to help support his foundation. He came on as a second-half substitute as England beat the Americans 3–0, gaining his 120th and final cap. England then resumed their UEFA Nations League participation with their final group match at home to Croatia, with a win required to top the group. England won 2–1 with two late goals, ensuring this first-place finish and putting them into the UEFA Nations League finals to be held the following year.

In March 2019 England began their UEFA Euro 2020 qualifying campaign with a 5–0 home win and a 5–1 away victory against the Czech Republic and Montenegro respectively. England carried this momentum into June for the UEFA Nations League finals in Portugal, but they would lose 3–1 in extra-time to the Netherlands in the semi-final. England went on to finish third in the finals, playing in the third-place play-off against Switzerland. A goalless 120 minutes resulted in a penalty shoot-out which England won — their second penalty shoot-out win in two years.

In October 2019, England continued UEFA Euro 2020 qualifying with a 6–0 win in Sofia against Bulgaria, in a match which was overshadowed by England players walking off the pitch due to chants of racism. In November 2019, England played their 1,000th match in the team's history, an emphatic 7–0 home win over Montenegro which ensured England's qualification for Euro 2020 as group winners.

2020s

A changed world

An unprecedented global crisis occurred during the beginning of the decade as the COVID-19 pandemic hit, affecting every aspect of occupation and leisure including the football world. By March 2020 most of football, including English and European football, was brought to a three-month halt, aiming to prioritise other people's health against the pandemic. Consequently, upcoming friendlies against Italy and Denmark in March and Austria and Romania in June were cancelled, while UEFA Euro 2020 was unprecedentedly postponed by one year, to 2021. England would not play a first match of 2020 until 5 September where they would participate in the 2020–21 season of the UEFA Nations League. The matches in the competition, as well as friendlies and 2022 FIFA World Cup opening qualifiers in 2021, were to be played behind closed doors under the pandemic rules and restrictions. 

In the 2020–21 UEFA Nations League England were drawn in Group A2 with Belgium, Denmark and Iceland. England began the campaign with a sluggish yet dramatic 1–0 away win over their Euro 2016 humiliators Iceland with Raheem Sterling converting a late penalty just moments before the Icelanders missed a penalty themselves in the final minute. England then played a 0–0 draw against Denmark in Copenhagen before a 2–1 home win over the top ranked team in the world, Belgium in October 2020. Three days later, England suffered a setback, losing 1–0 at home to Denmark as England defender Harry Maguire conceded Denmark's winning penalty and was one of two players sent off for England. They then lost 2–0 away to Belgium before beating Iceland 4–0 at home in their final group match. England finished third-place in the group behind Belgium and Denmark and failed to qualify for the Nations League finals.

England then went to preparation for the delayed Euro 2020 with home friendly matches against Austria and Romania. England won 1–0 in both of those matches.

Euro 2020 (in 2021): England reach the Final

UEFA Euro 2020 was a tournament held across Europe in 11 countries including England. Following on from a difficult season devoid of supporters because of the COVID-19 outbreak, limited crowds of spectators were permitted to attend the matches, watching from the stands with attendances increasing as the tournament went by. England were drawn in Group D with Croatia, Scotland and Czech Republic and played all three of the group matches at Wembley which also held both semi-finals and Final of the tournament. England kicked off the campaign with a 1–0 win over Croatia with Raheem Sterling scoring a second-half winner. In the second group stage match, England were frustrated in a 0–0 draw with Scotland at Wembley. England then won 1–0 against Czech Republic thanks to another Sterling winner, ensuring that England would finish top of the group and face off against the runner-up of Group F at Wembley.

England played against long-time rivals Germany in the round of 16. Boss Gareth Southgate made the decision to switch to a back three instead of the back four which England had used in the group stage matches. Despite this change they prevailed 2–0 with goals by Sterling and skipper Harry Kane. England then travelled to Italy to play in the quarter-finals against Ukraine at the Stadio Olimpico in Rome. Re-using the back four formation England won 4–0 with Kane scoring a brace either side of a goal by Harry Maguire, and with Jordan Henderson netting his first goal for the national team.

England then returned to Wembley, playing in the semi-final against Denmark. The Danes took a first-half lead through a Mikkel Damsgaard free-kick, the first goal England had conceded at the tournament. They quickly responded as an attacking move and pressure by Sterling forced Simon Kjær to bundle home an own goal for England's equaliser. England then dominated the second-half but could not find a way through Denmark's defence as the match went into extra-time. England continued to pile on the pressure and they eventually won a controversial penalty in the extra-time first-half period. As Harry Kane prepared to take the spot-kick a pen laser was aimed at the Danish goalkeeper Kasper Schmeichel to weaken his attempt in saving the penalty; UEFA would later fine the FA for this incident. Regardless Schmeichel saved the penalty but Kane slotted home the rebound which proved the winning goal, sending England to the Final of the tournament, England's first major Final since 1966.

England faced Italy in the Final at Wembley in front of over 67,000 supporters. Southgate opted for the back three formation that they used against Germany in the round of 16 despite using the back four for the majority of the knock-out stages. England made a bright start and took the lead after just 2 minutes through Luke Shaw, his first goal for the country and the quickest goal scored at a European Championship Final. However, Italy eventually improved, dominating the second-half and eventually equalising through a scrappy goal by Leonardo Bonucci, resulting in extra-time. No goals occurred during a cagey 30-minute period meaning that the match would be decided through a penalty shoot-out. England took a 2–1 shoot-out lead as England goalkeeper Jordan Pickford saved from Andrea Belotti and Maguire converted his spot-kick. However, England were pegged back 2–2 as Bonucci scored his penalty and Marcus Rashford hit the post despite Italy's goalkeeper Gianluigi Donnarumma going the wrong way. England then fell behind as Donnarumma saved from Jadon Sancho, putting England on the brink of defeat. Italy's number-one penalty taker Jorginho had the opportunity to give Italy the win, but his effort was stopped by Pickford. But, just as England looked to have been revived, England missed again, this time through Bukayo Saka, meaning that Italy won the shoot-out 3–2 and were crowned the champions of Europe.

The Final was surrounded with controversy after England fans without tickets attempted to enter the stadium. Two hours before the game, footage showed hundreds of England fans attempting to charge into Wembley Stadium. 86 people were arrested during the altercations. Following the match, UEFA started disciplinary proceedings against the Football Association (FA) and would fine the FA £84,560 as well as forcing England to play one UEFA Nations League match behind closed doors. Furthermore, the three players that missed penalties for England in the shoot-out: Marcus Rashford, Bukayo Saka and Jadon Sancho received racist abuse online. A mural was painted in support of the trio.

England confirmed their qualification to the 2022 FIFA World Cup in November 2021 for the 16th time in their history following a 10–0 away win against San Marino. This was also the first time England had scored double figures in a match since 1964. 

The team had a poor 2022–23 UEFA Nations League campaign, finishing bottom of Group 3. Relegation to League B was confirmed with a 1–0 defeat to Italy. England had previously lost twice to Hungary including a 4–0 home defeat, their largest home defeat since 1928. The first defeat in the group was England's first defeat in 22 matches, a record for the national team.

2022 FIFA World Cup

For the 2022 FIFA World Cup, England were drawn alongside Iran, the United States and Wales in group B. In the first match, England won 6–2 thanks to goals from Jude Bellingham, a brace from Bukayo Saka, Raheem Sterling, Marcus Rashford and Jack Grealish. England would then play out a goalless draw with the United States in the second match. In the final match, England confirmed qualification to the knockouts and first place with a 3–0 win against neighbours Wales with goals from Phil Foden and a brace from Rashford.

In the round of 16, England faced African champions Senegal. Two late first-half goals put England into control thanks to Jordan Henderson and Harry Kane before Saka added a third to ensure England's qualification for the next round. However, England were eliminated in the quarter-finals against world champions France. An early goal for Aurélien Tchouaméni had put France ahead before Harry Kane equalised from the penalty spot, his 53rd England goal which put him level with Wayne Rooney as England's record goal scorer. Late in the match, a header from Olivier Giroud had put France ahead. England were granted another penalty and a chance to level the match in the 84th minute, however, Harry Kane missed and England were eliminated. Post-match, the referee Wilton Sampaio was strongly criticised for his performance.

References

 
England